Alessio di Mauro and Simone Vagnozzi were the defending champions but Vagnozzi decided not to participate.
di Mauro played alongside Alessandro Motti.
Íñigo Cervantes Huegun and Federico Delbonis won the title after defeating Martin Kližan and Stéphane Robert 6–7(3–7), 6–1, [10–5] in the final.

Seeds

Draw

Draw

References
 Main draw

2012 Doubles
Rabat,Doubles